"Albay Forever", also known as the Albay Hymn or the Albay Provincial Hymn, is the official anthem of the province of Albay in the Philippines.

History
"Albay Forever" was composed by Jose R. Ravalo of Daraga, who also wrote the song's original English lyrics.

The Sangguniang Panlalawigan of Albay officially adopted the song on March 31, 2004, with the passage of Ordinance No. 02-2004. Lyrics in Central Bikol, the largest regional language spoken in the province, were also subsequently adopted.

Lyrics

The lyrics of the song have been interpreted as a call for Albayanos to love and protect their environment.

Performance
Singing "Albay Forever" is mandatory whenever there is an official event being held in the province of Albay, alongside the recitation of the provincial pledge, "I Am an Albayano".

During the 2013 Daragang Magayon Festival in Legazpi, the provincial capital, a two-round contest was held between teams to see who can extract the most coconut milk out of a pile of coconuts to the tune of the anthem.

References

External links
Videos of the Albay Hymn with lyrics and vocal performances:

Regional songs
Culture of Albay
English-language Filipino songs
Asian anthems
Philippine anthems